Taylor Gontineac (born 16 July 2000) is a French-born Romanian rugby union rugby player who is the son of former Romania Rugby legend and former captain Romeo Gontineac. He plays as a centre for professional Top 14 club ASM Clermont Auvergne`s espoirs.

Club career

Taylor Gontineac started playing rugby in his hometown of Aurillac for local teams influenced by his father Romeo Gontineac. Then due to his success, Taylor scored a contract with ASM Clermont Auvergne to play for their Espoirs team and in the future to play for the Top 14 side.

References

External links

2000 births
Living people
People from Aurillac
French people of Romanian descent
French people of South African descent
Romanian rugby union players
Romania international rugby union players
ASM Clermont Auvergne players
Rugby union centres
Sportspeople from Cantal
Romanian people of South African descent